Tibet Airlines Flight 9833 was a scheduled commercial passenger flight in China from Chongqing to Nyingchi by Tibet Airlines. On 12 May 2022, the A319-100 aircraft operating the service suffered a runway excursion, causing both engines to separate, followed by a fire near the front of the aircraft. 36 people were injured during the evacuation.

Incident 
During the aircraft's takeoff roll on runway 03/21, the pilots experienced an "abnormality" and aborted the takeoff. The plane veered off the runway, its engines detaching in the process. The engines, as well as the front of the aircraft, subsequently caught on fire. All 122 passengers and crew were evacuated  with 36 of them suffering minor injuries.

Aircraft 
The aircraft involved in the accident is an Airbus A319-100 with the registration of B-6425 and serial number 5157. It was delivered to Tibet Airlines on 23 November 2012. The plane was equipped with CFM56 engines and had Sharklets fitted in December 2018.

See also 

 British Airways Flight 2276
 Korean Air Flight 2708
 British Airtours Flight 28M
 American Airlines Flight 383

References

External links 

2022 disasters in China
Accidents and incidents involving the Airbus A319
Aviation accidents and incidents in 2022
Aviation accidents and incidents in China
History of Chongqing
May 2022 events in China
Yubei District